Nationality words link to articles with information on the nation's poetry or literature (for instance, Irish or France).

Events
Italian poet Torquato Tasso's epic poem Jerusalem Delivered (La Gerusalemme liberata) is first published complete, a pirated edition printed in Parma being followed by an authorized edition from Ferrara, where the poet is confined in the Ospedale di Sant'Anna. Also this year, Aldus Manutius the Younger prints a selection of Tasso's lyrics and prose in Venice.

Works published

Great Britain
 Anonymous, A Triumph for True Subjects, and a Terrour unto al Tratiours, ballad on the execution of Edmund Campion on December 1, 1561, attributed to William Elderton, who was likely not the author
 Sir Philip SIdney, An Apology for Poetry

Other
 Marie de Romieu, Premières Œuvres poetiques de MaDamoiselle Marie de Romieu Vivaroise, France
 Philippe Desportes, an edition of his works; France
 Torquato Tasso, Jerusalem Delivered (La Gerusalemme liberata), Italy

Births
 March 16 – Pieter Corneliszoon Hooft (died 1647), Dutch historian, poet and playwright
 Also:
Henry Adamson (died 1637), Scottish poet and historian
Hieronim Morsztyn (died 1623), Polish poet
Sir Thomas Overbury (murdered 1613), English poet and essayist
Lucy Russell, Countess of Bedford (died 1627), English countess, minor poet and major patron of poets

Deaths
 Hywel ap Syr Mathew (born unknown), Welsh poet, genealogist and soldier
 Paul Speratus died (born 1484), German
 Mikolaj Sep Szarzynski died (born c. 1550), Polish
 Surdas, died sometime from this year to 1584 (born 1478 or 1479), Indian, Hindi poet and saint who wrote in the Brij Bhasha dialect

See also

 Poetry
 16th century in poetry
 16th century in literature
 Dutch Renaissance and Golden Age literature
 Elizabethan literature
 French Renaissance literature
 Renaissance literature
 Spanish Renaissance literature
 University Wits

Notes

16th-century poetry
Poetry